319 may refer to:

The year 319
319 (number)
"319", the title of a Prince song from the album The Gold Experience